The Nigeria Immigration Service (NIS) is governmental organization responsible for border security and migration management in Nigeria. It was established by the Act of Parliament in 1963. In 2015, the 1963 Act was repelled and replaced with the Immigration Act 2015 which positions the service with the legal instrument  to combat Smuggling of Migrant(SOM) in Nigeria.

History 
The Nigeria Immigration Service (NIS) was extracted from the Nigeria Police (NP) in August 1958. It was at that time referred to as the Immigration Department and headed by the Chief Federal Immigration Officer (CFIO).

The Immigration Department was established by an Act of Parliament (Cap 171, Laws of the Federation of Nigeria) on August 1, 1963, when Alhaji Shehu Shagari was the Minister of Internal Affairs (a position now referred to as Minister of Interior).

The initial Law regulating Immigration Duties was the Immigration Act of 1963 which was amended in 2014 and again in 2015 (Immigration Act, 2015).

The Service has from 1963 been restructured to manage modern migration in line with global, regional and sub-regional political alignments.

The NIS has leveraged the use of Information and Communication Technologies in its operations including:
 The introduction of the Machine Readable electronic passport (MRP) in 2007
 The creation of a Service website (www.immigration.gov.ng) and portal (portal.immigration.gov.ng)
 Global Passport intervention in line with the Federal Government Policy on Citizenship Diplomacy
 Forensic laboratory services for the examination of travel documents and monetary instruments
 The introduction of the Combined Expatriate Residence Permit and Aliens Card (CERPAC)

As empowered by Section 2 the Immigration Act, 2015, the Service is responsible for:
 The control of persons entering or leaving Nigeria
 The issuance of travel documents, including Nigerian passports, to bonafide Nigerians within and outside Nigeria
 The issuance of residence permits to foreigners in Nigeria
 Border surveillance and patrol
 Enforcement of laws and regulations with which they are directly charged; and
 The performance of such para-military duties within or outside Nigeria as may be required of them under the authority of this Act or any other enactment

Enabling Instruments 
 Nigerian Immigration Act 2015
 Immigration Regulation 2017
 Immigration Manual 2019
 Standard Operating Procedure for Combating SOM 2019
 Nigerian Visa Policy 2020

Lists of Leadership 
 E. H. Harrison, Esq (Chief Federal Immigration Officer) from 1962 - 1966
 J. E. Onugogu, Esq (Chief Federal Immigration Officer) from 1966 - 1967
 Alayedeino, Esq (Chief Federal Immigration Officer) from 1967 - 1976
 Alhaji Aliyu Muhammed (Director of Immigration) from 1977 - 1979
 Alhaji Lawal Sambo (Director of Immigration) from 1979 -1985
 Muhammed Damulak, Esq (Director of Immigration) from 1985 - 1990
 Alhaji Garba Abbas (last Director of Immigration, 1st Comptroller-General Immigration Service - CGIS) from 1990 - 1995
 Alhaji Sahabi Abubakar (Comptroller-General Immigration Service - CGIS) from 1995 - 1999
 Alhaji U. K. Umar (Acting Comptroller-General Immigration Service - Ag. CGIS) from 1999 - 2000
 Lady U. C. Nwizu (Comptroller-General Immigration Service - CGIS) from 2000 - 2004
 Mr. Chukwurah Joseph Udeh (Comptroller-General Immigration Service - CGIS) from 2005 - 2010
 Mrs. Rose Chinyere Uzoma (Comptroller-General Immigration Service - CGIS) from 2010 - 2013
 Rilwan Bala Musa, mni (Acting Comptroller-General Immigration Service - Ag. CGIS) 2013
 David Shikfu Parradang, mni (Comptroller-General Immigration Service - CGIS) from 2013 - 2015
 Martin Kure Abeshi (Comptroller-General Immigration Service - CGIS) from 2015 - 2016
 Muhammed Babandede, MFR (Comptroller-General Immigration Service - CGIS) from 2016 - 2021
 Idris Isah Jere , Acting (Comptroller-General Immigration Service - CGIS) from 2021 to Date

References

Immigration services